

Gmina Lewin Brzeski is an urban-rural gmina (administrative district) in Brzeg County, Opole Voivodeship, in south-western Poland.

The gmina contains part of the protected area called Stobrawa Landscape Park.

Villages
Apart from the town of Lewin Brzeski, Gmina Lewin Brzeski contains the villages and settlements of Błażejowice, Borkowice, Buszyce, Chróścina, Golczowice, Jasiona, Kantorowice, Leśniczówka, Łosiów, Mikolin, Niwa, Nowa Wieś Mała, Oldrzyszowice, Piaski, Przecza, Ptakowice, Raski, Różyna, Sarny Małe, Skorogoszcz, Stroszowice, Strzelniki and Wronów.

Neighbouring gminas
Gmina Lewin Brzeski is bordered by the gminas of Dąbrowa, Niemodlin, Olszanka, Popielów and Skarbimierz.

Twin towns – sister cities

Gmina Lewin Brzeski is twinned with:
 Szegvár, Hungary

References

Lewin Brzeski
Brzeg County